Oligodon splendidus, commonly known as the splendid kukri snake, is a species of snake of the family Colubridae.

The species, belonging to the genus Oligodon, is endemic to Myanmar. It was first described by Albert Günther in 1875 as Simotes splendidus.

References 

splendidus
Snakes of Southeast Asia
Reptiles of Myanmar
Endemic fauna of Myanmar
Reptiles described in 1875
Taxa named by Albert Günther